The Primetime Emmy Award for Picture Editing for a Nonfiction Program is awarded to one television documentary or nonfiction series each year.

Prior to 2006, nonfiction and reality programs competed together until the Outstanding Picture Editing for Reality Programming category was created.

In the following list, the first titles listed in gold are the winners; those not in gold are nominees, which are listed in alphabetical order. The years given are those in which the ceremonies took place.



Winners and nominations

1970s

1980s

1990s

2000s

2010s

2020s

Programs with multiple nominations

10 nominations
 American Masters

4 nominations
 Anthony Bourdain: Parts Unknown

2 nominations
 America Undercover
 Anthony Bourdain: No Reservations
 Planet Earth II
 This American Life
 Vice
 The War

Notes

References

Picture Editing for a Nonfiction Program